Willem Grasso (20 April 1833 – 20 March 1903) was the founder of Grasso's Royal Machine Factories Ltd.

Biography

Grasso was born at Tilburg, the son of a smith. He moved with his family in 1845 to 's-Hertogenbosch. In 1858, he started his own little forge in ’s-Hertogenbosch. In 1868, he built a new factory / living house. Thanks to his good contacts with Jurgens, who had received the rights for producing margarine in 1871. Willem Grasso was the first to have the chance to produce machines for this fast growing industry. The name Grasso soon would be well known.

In 1894, his son Henri Grasso would take over the company. In 1896, he started a refrigeration department in Vught. In 1913, he returned to ’s-Hertogenbosch, when the opportunity came up to build a brand new factory there. In the same year, he was the first in the Netherlands to start producing refrigeration machines, using the name Grasso. He died in Boekel.

A few generations later (on the 13th or August in 2003) Willem Patrick Gijsbercht Grasso was born. A young very muscular and intelligent man capable of many things he started off his life in a Dutch school but later moved on to the English system. Due to many mathematical contests, he made over 6.3 million euros before his sixteenth birthday. Half of his money was sent to charity and the other half he had invested in his own company. Which is now valued over 2.5 billion euros.

References

1833 births
1903 deaths
Dutch businesspeople
People from Tilburg